In Greek mythology, Lycurgus (Ancient Greek: Λυκοῦργος Lykoûrgos,), also Lykurgos or Lykourgos, may refer to the following individuals:

 Lycurgus, son of Aleus, and king of Tegea in Arcadia
 Lycurgus, a king of Nemea, and son of Pheres.
 Lycurgus, king of Thrace and opponent of Dionysus.
 Lycurgus, son of Pronax, son of King Talaus of Argos, and thus, brother to Amphithea, wife of Adrastus. He was one of those who were raised from the dead by Asclepius.
 Lycurgus, the Thespian son of Heracles and Toxicrate, daughter of King Thespius of Thespiae. Lycurgus and his 49 half-brothers were born of Thespius' daughters who were impregnated by Heracles in one night, for a week or in the course of 50 days while hunting for the Cithaeronian lion. Later on, the hero sent a message to Thespius to keep seven of these sons and send three of them in Thebes while the remaining forty, joined by Iolaus, were dispatched to the island of Sardinia to found a colony.
 Lycurgus, a suitor of Princess Hippodamia of Pisa, Elis. Like other suitors, he was killed by the bride's father, King Oenomaus.
 Lycurgus, another Thracian king who was the son of Boreas. He was plotted against by his brother Butes but discovering his conspiracy sent him into exile.
 Lycurgus, alternative for Lycomedes in Homer.

Notes

References 

 Apollodorus, The Library with an English Translation by Sir James George Frazer, F.B.A., F.R.S. in 2 Volumes, Cambridge, MA, Harvard University Press; London, William Heinemann Ltd. 1921. ISBN 0-674-99135-4. Online version at the Perseus Digital Library. Greek text available from the same website.
 Athenaeus of Naucratis, The Deipnosophists or Banquet of the Learned. London. Henry G. Bohn, York Street, Covent Garden. 1854. Online version at the Perseus Digital Library.
 Athenaeus of Naucratis, Deipnosophistae. Kaibel. In Aedibus B.G. Teubneri. Lipsiae. 1887. Greek text available at the Perseus Digital Library.
 Diodorus Siculus, The Library of History translated by Charles Henry Oldfather. Twelve volumes. Loeb Classical Library. Cambridge, Massachusetts: Harvard University Press; London: William Heinemann, Ltd. 1989. Vol. 3. Books 4.59–8. Online version at Bill Thayer's Web Site
 Diodorus Siculus, Bibliotheca Historica. Vol 1-2. Immanel Bekker. Ludwig Dindorf. Friedrich Vogel. in aedibus B. G. Teubneri. Leipzig. 1888-1890. Greek text available at the Perseus Digital Library.
 Homer, The Iliad with an English Translation by A.T. Murray, Ph.D. in two volumes. Cambridge, MA., Harvard University Press; London, William Heinemann, Ltd. 1924. Online version at the Perseus Digital Library.
 Homer, Homeri Opera in five volumes. Oxford, Oxford University Press. 1920. Greek text available at the Perseus Digital Library.
 Pausanias, Description of Greece with an English Translation by W.H.S. Jones, Litt.D., and H.A. Ormerod, M.A., in 4 Volumes. Cambridge, MA, Harvard University Press; London, William Heinemann Ltd. 1918. . Online version at the Perseus Digital Library
 Pausanias, Graeciae Descriptio. 3 vols. Leipzig, Teubner. 1903. Greek text available at the Perseus Digital Library.
 Tzetzes, John, Book of Histories, Book II-IV translated by Gary Berkowitz from the original Greek of T. Kiessling's edition of 1826. Online version at theio.com

Princes in Greek mythology
Kings in Greek mythology
Thracian kings
Children of Heracles
Mythology of Argos